The silvery flying fox (Pteropus argentatus), also known as Ambon flying fox,  or silvery fruit bat, is a megabat in the genus Pteropus from eastern Indonesia. It is known from a single, damaged, and immature specimen that was thought to have been from Ambon, but may in fact have been collected on Gebe Island. Although often included in Pteropus chrysoproctus, it was reinstated as a separate species in 2008.

References

Pteropus
Mammals of Indonesia
Mammals described in 1844
Taxonomy articles created by Polbot
Taxa named by John Edward Gray
Bats of Indonesia
Taxobox binomials not recognized by IUCN